Milton Marshall Gray (February 21, 1914 – June 30, 1969) was a Major League Baseball catcher who played in two games for the Washington Senators in .

External links

1914 births
1969 deaths
Washington Senators (1901–1960) players
Baseball players from Louisville, Kentucky